Antonio Serrano may refer to:

Antonio Serrano (director) (born 1955), Mexican director, actor and writer
Antonio Serrano (runner) (born 1965), Spanish marathon runner
Antonio Serrano (footballer) (born 1979), Peruvian footballer
Marcos-Antonio Serrano (born 1972), Spanish cyclist

See also
Serrano (surname), a Romance-language surname